The 2019 MSA British Rally Championship will be the 61st season of the series, the premier rally competition in the UK.

The championship will feature eight classes:

 BRC 1 (R5, R4, Super 2000, Regional Rally Car)
 BRC Production Cup (N4)
 BRC 3 (R3)
 BRC 4 (R2)
 National Rally Cup (open class)
 Junior BRC (R2, drivers under 26 years old)
 Cadet Cup (R2, drivers under 25 years old)
 Ladies BRC Trophy

Calendar

The 2019 championship will be contested over six rounds in six different territories England, Scotland, Wales, Northern Ireland, Ireland and Belgium. The Wales Rally GB has been added as a reserve event. The events will be held on both tarmac and gravel surfaces. 

 Calendar subject to approval by the MSA

Team and Drivers
BRC1 Entries

Junior BRC Entries

Cadet Cup Entries

Ladies BRC Trophy Entries

Event results

Podium places and information on each event.

Drivers Points Classification

Scoring system

Points are awarded as follows: 25, 18, 15, 12, 10, 8, 6, 4, 2, 1. Drivers may nominate one event as their 'joker', on which they will score additional points: 5, 4, 3, 2, 1. Competitors five best scores will count towards their championship total.

British Rally Championship for Drivers

British Rally Championship for Co-Drivers

References

British Rally Championship seasons
Rally Championship
British Rally Championship